Le Bocage International School (LBIS) is an English-medium, private international school offering educational services to boys and girls from the ages of 11–19.

LBIS was founded in 1990 and is located at Mount Ory, Moka (Mauritius). LBIS is an IBO school that offers the International Baccalaureate Program for the Middle Years, form 1–5, and the Diploma years, form 6–7. It also prepares students for the IGCSE and the International Baccalaureate examinations.

Facilities 

The school has more than forty teaching rooms including four science laboratories (physics laboratory, chemistry laboratory, biology laboratory), three computer rooms, two art studios, three Design & Technology workshops, a home economics laboratory and a large purpose-built library with a host of about 9,500 resources ranging from science books to fictional books with a floor dedicated to online research. In addition also has facilities such as a music room, a recording studio as well as a theatre in its new performing arts building. 

Outdoor facilities include a playing field, outdoor hard court surfaces and a multi-purpose sports hall, completed in 2001, which also functions as an auditorium for the many special events held each year such as International Night, Graduation Ceremony and National Day.

Enrollment and student body 

Students are enrolled in Forms 1–7 (UK years 7–13, US grades 6–12) that comprise approximately twenty-seven nationalities. Students come from a wide variety of social and cultural backgrounds, and most are bilingual. 89% of the students are Mauritian.

Accreditation 

LBIS is accredited by the Mauritian Ministry of Education and is a fully accredited member of the Council of International Schools (CIS)

Governance 

LBIS is operated by PROGOS, a non-profit making company that exists solely for the purpose of offering an English medium international education. The Board of Directors is the ultimate authority and delegates management of the school to the Headmaster.

Teaching staff and posts of responsibility 

The school employs approximately seventy qualified teachers, many of which hold postgraduate qualifications in education. There are also three librarians, a careers counsellor, a guidance counsellor, a Special Educational Needs team of three teachers and a nurse. 
 
Curriculum responsibilities are shared by Heads of Department in eight key learning areas and the coordinators of the Middle Years, IGCSE and IB Diploma programmes of study.

Language policy 

The school is an English medium school.

Academic programme 

The school prepares students for higher education in Mauritius, or abroad. There are three developmental levels of learning adopted, which are as follows:

 Forms 1–3 Contents Standards Framework Curriculum based on 8 key learning areas
 Forms 4–5 The International Certificate of Education (ICE) preparing students for IGCSE examinations
 Forms 6–7 The IB Diploma Programme or B-TECH programme which focuses on Business or Physical Education.

, the curriculum is having some changes to work with the MYP program.

In 2019 the school achieved a score of 95.5% in the International Baccalaureate examination, an increase from 85.7% in 2015.

Gallery

See also

 List of secondary schools in Mauritius 
 Education in Mauritius

References

External links
Le Bocage Homepage

Educational institutions established in 1990
Schools in Mauritius
Moka District
International schools in Mauritius
1990 establishments in Mauritius